The Green Mountain Peace and Justice Party, known as the Liberty Union Party (LUP) until 2021, is a political party active in the U.S. state of Vermont. It is a self-proclaimed "non-violent socialist party". 

The LUP was founded in 1970 by former Congressman William H. Meyer, Peter Diamondstone, Dennis Morrisseau and others, and was described by The New York Times as the cradle of progressivism in Vermont. The party is the fourth-largest in the state after the Democratic, Republican, and Progressive parties.

History

The Liberty Union party (LUP) was formed to contest the Vermont elections of 1970. In 1971, People's Party was formed as a national umbrella party for various socialist-oriented state parties including the LUP.

Bernie Sanders joined Liberty Union in 1971 and became the party's candidate for several offices. At the first Party meeting he attended, in 1971, Sanders was nominated to be the Party's Senate candidate in the January 1972 special election; he placed third with 2% of the vote. Sanders was the party's candidate for Vermont governor in 1976 where he received 6.1% of the vote, which remains the best result for any LUP candidate for governor as of 2021. At the time of his resignation from the party in October 1977, he was party chairman. Sanders quit due to the inactivity of the party between elections.  As an independent politician, Sanders became Vermont's congressional representative in 1991 and U.S. senator in 2007. He ran unsuccessfully as a Democratic presidential candidate in 2016 and 2020.

In 1974, political scientist Michael Parenti was the party's candidate for election to the House of Representatives; he placed third with 7.1 percent of the vote. Bernie Sanders ran again as the Senate candidate, but received 4.13% of the vote.

In 1976, the party's Vermont lieutenant governor candidate John Franco took enough votes to force the election to the Vermont General Assembly's House. The party also lost the outspoken members, Nancy Kaufman and Martha Abbott before the 1978 election cycle. Despite Liberty Union co-founder, Peter Diamondstone, appearing biennially on the ballot from 1970 through 2016, none of the party's candidates were elected during that period.

In local Vermont town elections in 2009 a Liberty Union and Vermont Progressive Party endorsed candidate, David Van Deusen, won a contested race for a seat on the Moretown Select Board.  Van Deusen, at the time a District Vice President of the Vermont AFL-CIO active within US Labor Against The War, and cofounder of the Green Mountain Anarchist Collective, also received the backing of organized labor. This victory represented an electoral high water mark for the Liberty Union Party (previous Liberty Union wins included a Representational Town Meeting Delegate in Brattleboro, and a single Justice of the Peace position some decades earlier).  In 2010 Van Deusen again ran and again won a contested seat on the Moretown Select Board. Again he was endorsed by the Liberty Union, the Progressives, the Socialist Party USA, and organized labor. In this election Van Deusen was the top vote-getter among four Select Board candidates (three candidates, including Van Deusen running for two one year seats, and one candidate running as a write-in for one open three-year seat). In 2011 Van Deusen did not seek re-election to the Select Board. In this election he ran for First Constable of Moretown (a position he held in 2007). While Van Deusen won the election, he did not seek the endorsement of the Liberty Union Party. This time he had the endorsement of the local Progressive Party alone.  During Van Deusen's two terms on the Moretown Select Board, he was able to win "livable wages" for all non-elected town employees, doubled property tax relief for disabled military veterans (through a Town Meeting article), successfully advocated for the use of the Town Hall for a free weekly children's play group, made strides in opening up the local democratic process to all town residents, and publicly supported a Vermont run single-payer healthcare system.

In 2012, the party once again re-qualified for major party status as a result of a 13.1% showing for Liberty Union candidate Mary Alice Herbert in the election for Vermont Secretary of State against Democrat Jim Condos.

In 2014, the party re-qualified for major party status yet again as a result of a 10.32 showing for Liberty Union candidate Mary Alice Herbert in the election for Vermont Secretary of State. In the race for Treasurer Murray Ngoima received 8.3% of the vote.  For Attorney General the LU candidate, Rosemary Jackowski, received 3.9% of the vote. In VT State Senate races, Ben Bosley won 13.9% of the vote for Grand Isle district.  In the Windham County Senate contest, Jerry Levy & Aaron Diamondstone won on 5.0% & 4.6% of the ballots.

In the 2016 Vermont gubernatorial election, former Boston Red Sox pitcher Bill "Spaceman" Lee ran as the Liberty Union’s candidate for Governor. Lee supported single payer healthcare and ran far to the left of the Democratic Party while at the same time remaining an advocate for the right of Vermonters to own firearms. Lee received 2.8% of the vote, which was the highest percentage for a LUP candidate for governor since 1978.

In other 2016 races, Murray Ngoima received 3.9% of the vote for Treasurer, Mary Alice Herbert 9.7% for secretary state, Marina Brown 4.7% for Auditor and Rosemarie Jackowski 3.7% for attorney general. For US Congress, Erica Clawson received 9.2% of the vote. Liberty Union Party co-founder, Peter Diamondstone received 1.0% of the vote for US Senate.

In 2018 elections, Emily Peyton received 0.6% of the vote for Governorship, Murray Ngoima 1.5% for lieutenant governor, Mary Alice Herbert 3.6% for Secretary of State, Marina Brown 3.9% for Auditor and Rosemarie Jackowski 3.4% for Attorney General. For US Congress, Laura Potter received 1.4% of the vote. For US Senate, Reid Kane received 0.4% of the vote.

In 2020, the Liberty Union Party did not nominate any candidates for state office. They only nominated Gloria La Riva for presidency.

In September 2021, the party changed its name from Liberty Union to Green Mountain Peace and Justice. Jessica Diamondstone, party chair and daughter of the party's founder stated that she feared the old name might make the party sound as if it had right-wing positions. Diamondstone felt the new name would be more clear on the political positions of the party.

Presidential nominee
Over the years, it has selected various Presidential candidates from several national leftist political parties. For the 1972 and 1976 elections, the LUP was a member of the national People's Party, thus the People's presidential candidates were the LUP's. In 1980, 1988, 1996, and 2000 it endorsed the Socialist Party USA's candidates.  Mary Alice Herbert, the party's 2006 candidate for Lieutenant Governor, was the Vice Presidential candidate of the Socialist Party USA in 2004.  However, due to conflicts with her running mate, Walt Brown, the LUP gave its ballot line to Workers World Party candidates John Parker and Teresa Gutierrez.  In 2008, the Socialist Party's presidential candidate, Brian Moore, was the only candidate to collect the 1,000 signatures required to participate in the Liberty Union Party's presidential primary.  The primary election is binding, so Moore and his running mate Stewart Alexander were the Liberty Union nominees in the November general election.

See also
 List of political parties in the United States
 List of democratic socialist parties and organizations

References

External links
 libertyunionparty.org

Democratic socialist parties in the United States
Political parties in Vermont
Political parties established in 1970
State and local socialist parties in the United States
Political parties in the United States
1970 establishments in Vermont